Michmas was an Israelite and Jewish town located in the highlands north of Jerusalem. According to the Hebrew Bible, it belonged to the Tribe of Benjamin. It was the setting of the biblical Battle of Michmash, recounted in 1 Samuel 14. Michmas was inhabited during the Second Temple period, when, according to the Mishnah, its fine wheat was brought to the Temple.

Michmas is identified with the Palestinian village of Mukhmas in the West Bank, which preserves its ancient name. The nearby Israeli settlement Ma'ale Mikhmas, founded in 1981, is also named after the biblical town.

Location

Michmas was located near Geba, east of Bethel and south of Migron, and on the road to Jerusalem. Michmas lay on the line of march of an invading army from the north, on the north side of the steep and precipitous Nahal Michmas stream, known in Arabic as Wadi es-Suweinit ("valley of the little thorn-tree" or "the acacia").

Biblical account

The town is known by its connection with the Philistine war of Saul and Jonathan, as it was the site of the Battle of Michmash which was later recounted in the Bible. In 1 Samuel 13 ‘And Saul, and Jonathan his son, and the people that were present with them, abode in Gibeah of Benjamin, but the Philistines encamped in Michmas. According to the Bible, King Saul's son Jonathan was able to beat the Philistines by stepping out on faith in God, which caused panic throughout and a Philistine rout.

It tells how Jonathan and his armor-bearer showed themselves ‘to the Philistines’ garrison’ on the other side, and how they passed two sharp rocks: ‘there was a sharp rock on the one side, and a sharp rock on the other side: and the name of the one was Bozez and the name of the other Seneh.’ They clambered up the cliff and overpowered the garrison ‘within as it were an half acre of land, which a yoke of oxen might plough.’ The main body of the enemy awakened by the mêlée thought they were surrounded by Saul’s troops and ‘melted away and they went on beating down one another.’

A divinely sent earthquake, the effects of which were noted by Saul’s watchmen, threw the Philistine camp into turmoil. By the time Saul and his men came on the scene, many of the Philistines had slaughtered one another in confusion and the rest had taken to flight.

From Sennacherib to Maccabaeans
Isaiah mentions the town in the context of Sennacherib's invasion during the reign of Hezekiah. After the captivity the men of the place returned. At a later date it became the residence of Jonathan Maccabaeus and the seat of his government.

Second Temple period
Modern scholars have suggested that Michmas was a priestly settlement during the Second Temple period. It was inhabited up until Bar-Kokhba revolt, during the early 2nd century CE. The Mishnah teaches that the finest of the wheat used in the offering of the Omer was taken from Michmas and from Zanoah (Menachot 8:1).

During the 1980s, 4 clusters of tombs, consisting of roughly 70 burial caves, were found in the vicinity of modern-day Mukhmas. In one of the burial caves, an ancient graffiti of a seven-branched menorah was found, together with a Paleo-Hebrew inscription. In the 1990s, German researchers purchased a ossuary found in Mukhmas bearing the name ‘Shimeon L[evi]’, written in the Hebrew alphabet.

World War I
During World War I, British forces under the command of General Allenby were to face the Turks at the same location. Major Vivian Gilbert of the British army relates the story of an unnamed brigade major who was reading his Bible while contemplating the situation against the Ottoman forces.  The brigade major remembered a town by the name of Michmash mentioned somewhere in the Bible. He found the verses, and discovered that there was a secret path around the town. He woke the brigadier general, and they found that the path still existed and was very lightly guarded. The British forces used this path to outmaneuver the Ottomans, and so took the town.

Notes

References
 Against All Odds - Israel survives / Miraculous True Stories, DVD, 95 min., a dramatized documentary, produced by American Trademark Pictures. Distributed by Questar Inc., Chicago, Illinois.

External links

The Romance of the Last Crusade: with Allenby to Jerusalem, by Vivian Gilbert 

Hebrew Bible cities